Events in the year 2022 in Hong Kong.

Incumbents

Executive branch 
 Chief Executive: Carrie Lam
 Chief Secretary for Administration: John Lee
 Financial Secretary: Paul Mo-po Chan
 Secretary for Justice: Teresa Cheng

Legislative branch 
 President of the Legislative Council: Andrew Leung

Judicial branch 
 Chief Justice of the Court of Final Appeal: Andrew Cheung

Events

January
 3 January – The Seventh Legislative Council members take oath.  It would be the inaugural Legislative Council after 2021 Hong Kong electoral changes.
 7 January – Witman Hung partygate scandal emerges
 12 January – The first meeting of Seventh Legislative Council held.

February 
 9 February - The first time that Hong Kong recorded more than 1,000 COVID-19 infections in one day.
 10 February - Vaccine Pass scheme launched.  
 15 February - Chinese Communist Party leader Xi Jinping stressed to the Hong Kong government which must take the “main responsibility” in containing coronavirus pandemic and placing top priority on stability and people’s lives.
 25 February - The first time that Hong Kong recorded more than 10,000 COVID-19 infections in one day.

March 
 1 March – New Subscriber Identification Module (SIM Card) require real-name registration by the government.
 2 March - The first time that Hong Kong recorded more than 50,000 COVID-19 infections in one day.

May 
 8 May – 2022 Hong Kong Chief Executive election
 May 15 - MTR East Rail line extended from Hung Hom to Admiralty.

July 
 1 July – The new Chief Executive John Lee Ka-chiu take office.

Predicted and scheduled events

November
 30 November – The Small Unmanned Aircraft Order Enforced. Small unmanned aircraft (including small unmanned aerial photography aircraft) over 200 gram and remote pilots proceeds officially registration.  Remote pilots who drive over 7 kg unmanned aircraft (including aerial photography aircraft) need to take training and pass the formal assessment accepted by the government.

Arts and entertainment
 List of Hong Kong films of 2022
'List of 2022 box office number-one films in Hong Kong
 40th Hong Kong Film Awards — 17 July 2022
 Hong Kong International Film Festival — 15 August to 31 August 2022

Deaths
4 January – Hilton Cheong-Leen, politician (b. 1922)

References

External links

 
Years of the 21st century in Hong Kong
Hong Kong
Hong Kong